Yumai may refer to the following townships:
Ujme, also Yumai, Akto County, Kizilsu Kyrgyz Autonomous Prefecture, Xinjiang, China
Yümai, Lhünzê County, Shannan Prefecture, Tibet, China